Cercophonius granulosus is a species of small scorpion in the Bothriuridae family. It occurs in south-west Western Australia, and was first described in 1908 by German naturalist Karl Kraepelin.

References

 

 
granulosus
Scorpions of Australia
Fauna of Western Australia
Animals described in 1908
Taxa named by Karl Kraepelin
Endemic fauna of Australia